Carlos Velázquez (born 14 July 1925) is an Argentine modern pentathlete. He competed at the 1952 Summer Olympics.

References

External links
 

1925 births
Possibly living people
Argentine male modern pentathletes
Olympic modern pentathletes of Argentina
Modern pentathletes at the 1952 Summer Olympics
Pan American Games bronze medalists for Argentina
Pan American Games medalists in modern pentathlon
Modern pentathletes at the 1951 Pan American Games
Medalists at the 1951 Pan American Games
20th-century Argentine people